Calosoma ewersmanni is a species of ground beetle in the family Carabidae. It is found in Turkey.

Subspecies
These two subspecies belong to the species Calosoma ewersmanni:
 Calosoma ewersmanni ewersmanni (Chaudoir, 1850)
 Calosoma ewersmanni peksi Heinz & Pavesi, 1994

References

Calosoma
Beetles described in 1850